The Huni Kuin (also known as: Kaxinawá, Cashinahua, Kaschinawa, Kashinawa, Caxinauás) are an indigenous people of Brazil and Peru. Their villages are located along the Purus and Curanja Rivers in Peru and the Tarauacá, Jordão, Breu, Muru, Envira, Humaitã, and Purus Rivers in Brazil.

In the Peruvian Amazon rainforest, some Huni Kuin live on the Alto Purús Indigenous Territory with the Kulina people.

Name

The name Huni Kuin means "true people" or "people with traditions". The alternative name Kaxinawá means "cannibals", "bat people" and "people who walk about at night". It is still widespread in literature, yet the Huni Kuin reject the name as an insult.

Language
The Huni Kuin speak the Kaxinawá language, a Panoan language. They call their language Hancha Kuin, meaning "real words." Only 5% to 10% of the Huni Kuin in Peru speak Spanish and literacy rates are low.

Economy
Hunting is of paramount importance in Huni Kuin society. Huni Kuin also fish, gather plant foods, and grow crops through swidden, or slash-and-burn horticulture. Rice has become an export crop.

Women weave baskets, string bead jewelry, create utilitarian ceramics and weave hammocks and clothing. Men weave certain baskets, carve tools from wood, create featherwork and ceremonial regalia, and make canoes and weapons, such as clubs, spears, and bows and arrows. In hunting, shotguns are popular.

Notes

Indigenous peoples in Brazil
Indigenous peoples in Peru
Indigenous peoples of the Amazon
Hunter-gatherers of South America